The 2012–13 Biathlon World Cup – Mixed Relay started at Sunday November 25, 2012 in Östersund and finished in 2013 in Nové Město at Biathlon World Championships 2013 event.

Competition format
The relay teams consisted of four biathletes - legs 1 and 2 were done by the women, legs 3 and 4 by the men. The women's legs were 6 km and men's legs are 7.5 km.

Every athlete leg skied over three laps, with two shooting rounds; one prone, one standing. For every round of five targets there were eight bullets available, though the last three could only be single-loaded manually one at a time from spare round holders or bullets deposited by the competitor into trays or onto the mat at the firing line. If after eight bullets there were still misses, one 150 m penalty loop was taken for each missed target remaining.

The first-leg participants started at the same time, and as in cross-country skiing relays, every athlete of a team touched the team's next-leg participant to perform a valid changeover. On the first shooting stage of the first leg, the participant shot in the lane corresponding to their bib number (Bib 10 shot at lane 10 regardless of position in the race), then for the remainder of the relay, the relay team shot at the lane in the position they arrived. If arriving at the range in fifth place, the contestant shot at lane five.

Medal winners

Standings

References

- Mixed Relay, 2012-13 Biathlon World Cup
Biathlon